Luiza Złotkowska (born 25 May 1986) is a Polish speed skater. She is an Olympic silver and bronze medalist, and is the current holder of the Polish record on the 5000 m distance.

Speed skating career

Olympic Games

At the 2010 Winter Olympics in Vancouver, she won a bronze medal in the women's team pursuit together with Katarzyna Woźniak, Natalia Czerwonka and Katarzyna Bachleda-Curuś. Individually, she placed 34th in the 1500 metres and 24th in the 3000 metres. At the 2014 Winter Olympics in Sochi, she won silver medal in the team competition with Katarzyna Woźniak, Natalia Czerwonka and Katarzyna Bachleda-Curuś.

Personal records

Personal life

Złotkowska was born in Warsaw, Poland, but lives in Zielonka. In 2005, she graduated from the School of Sports Championships in Zakopane. She is also a graduate of the Academy of Physical Education in Kraków. In 2010, she was awarded the Knight's Cross of the Order of the Rebirth of Poland, in 2014, she was awarded the Officer's Cross  of the Order of the Rebirth of Poland. Złotkowska's fiancé is Jan Szymański, also a Polish speed skater.

References

External links
 Official website (translated)
 
 Luiza Zlotkowska profile from the International Skating Union
 

1986 births
Polish female speed skaters
Speed skaters at the 2010 Winter Olympics
Speed skaters at the 2014 Winter Olympics
Speed skaters at the 2018 Winter Olympics
Olympic speed skaters of Poland
Medalists at the 2010 Winter Olympics
Medalists at the 2014 Winter Olympics
Olympic medalists in speed skating
Olympic silver medalists for Poland
Olympic bronze medalists for Poland
Knights of the Order of Polonia Restituta
Speed skaters from Warsaw
Universiade medalists in speed skating
Living people
Universiade bronze medalists for Poland
Speed skaters at the 2007 Winter Universiade
Competitors at the 2009 Winter Universiade